Nine News Now was an Australian afternoon news bulletin which aired on the Nine Network and was presented by Amber Sherlock (Monday – Thursday) and Belinda Russell (Friday).

History
The bulletin launched on 7 January 2013 and was originally presented by Wendy Kingston.

In December 2013, Kingston went on maternity leave and whilst she was on leave Alison Ariotti and Natalia Cooper along with other presenters filled in for her. Kingston did not return to her original role on Nine News Now, instead becoming the news presenter on Weekend Today. Wendy's last appearance was on 19 December 2013 before relieving Lisa Wilkinson on Today.

In October 2014, Amelia Adams returned from maternity leave to front the bulletin from Tuesday to Friday with Amber Sherlock hosting on Monday.

In May 2016, Amber Sherlock replaced Amelia Adams presenting the bulletin from Monday to Thursday with Belinda Russell presenting on Friday.

In September 2017, Amelia Adams became the Friday presenter with Belinda Russell moving to focus on presenting weather on Thursday and Friday's during Nine Afternoon News.

The bulletin went on hiatus in November 2019, with episodes of the British game show Tipping Point airing in its place during the summer non-ratings period. The bulletin did not return in 2020.

Format
The bulletin featured the latest news in entertainment along with panel discussions of the day's topics but with limited sports coverage and was aimed at stay-at-home mothers and women over 55.

The Chat Room segment involved panel discussions with Nine News presenters and reporters talking about the hot topics of the day.

Fill-in presenters for the bulletin included Sophie Walsh, Vicky Jardim, Sylvia Jeffreys, Amber Sherlock, Deborah Knight and Ross Greenwood.

References

Nine News
Australian television news shows
2013 Australian television series debuts
Television shows set in Sydney
English-language television shows
2019 Australian television series endings